Mijat Gaćinović (born 8 February 1995) is a Serbian professional footballer who plays as a midfielder for Greek Super League club AEK Athens and the Serbia national team.

Club career

Vojvodina
Gaćinović was born in Novi Sad while his father Vladimir played for FK Bečej. His family is from Trebinje in Bosnia and Herzegovina, where Gaćinović returned when his father finished his career. He started to play football at Leotar, before joining the youth academy of Vojvodina. He made his first team debut under manager Nebojša Vignjević on 19 March 2013, coming off the bench as a substitute for Miroslav Vulićević in a 3–0 home win over Donji Srem. On 18 May 2013, Gaćinović scored his first senior goal in a 3–2 home league victory over Radnički Niš.

After already establishing his place in the starting lineup, Gaćinović helped Vojvodina win the 2013–14 Serbian Cup in the club's centennial year. He was named the team's captain in early 2015, eventually becoming their top league scorer in the 2014–15 season, netting 11 goals.

Eintracht Frankfurt
In the summer of 2015, Gaćinović moved to Germany and signed with Eintracht Frankfurt. He made his official debut for the club on 28 November 2015, playing the full 90 minutes in a 1–2 away league loss against Mainz 05. On 19 May 2016, Gaćinović scored the equalizer in the first leg of the 2015–16 Bundesliga relegation playoffs against Nürnberg, before assisting the only goal in the return leg away to keep his club in the top flight.

Hoffenheim
On 4 August 2020, Gaćinović signed for Hoffenheim as part of a swap deal, with Steven Zuber going to Frankfurt. He put pen to paper on a 4-year contract.

Loan to Panathinaikos
On 31 January 2022, in the last day of winter transfer window, Panathinaikos completed the loan signing of Gaćinović, until the summer of 2022.

AEK Athens
On 28 June 2022, Gaćinović signed a 4-year contract with AEK Athens. The greek club paid an estimated fee of €1,000,000, while Hoffenheim will keep a resale rate of 30%. 

In the first half of the 2022–23 season Mijat emerged as a leading figure in Matías Almeyda's plans, scoring 4 goals assisting another four. Following his return in action after the winter break and an injury, serbian sources confirmed that Stuttgart expressed interest in his services with an initial 6-month loan and an option to buy for the summer, with AEK denying any negotiation, unless potential offers exceed the sum of €8,000,000.

International career
Gaćinović played for Bosnia and Herzegovina at the Under-17 level, before eventually choosing to represent Serbia at the Under-19 level. He was a member of the team that won the 2013 UEFA European Under-19 Championship. Furthermore, Gaćinović scored an equalizer against Portugal in the 85th minute of the semi-final. He also appeared at the 2014 UEFA European Under-19 Championship.

Subsequently, Gaćinović represented Serbia at the 2015 FIFA U-20 World Cup, winning the gold medal.

He debuted for the senior national team on 24 March 2017 against Georgia, replacing Filip Kostić in the 81st minute, and scored the third goal for Serbia in the 86th minute. In May 2018 he was named in Serbia’s preliminary squad for the 2018 FIFA World Cup in Russia, but he wasn't selected for the final squad.

Career statistics

Club

International

International goals
As of match played 2 September 2017

Honours
Vojvodina
 Serbian Cup: 2013–14
Eintracht Frankfurt
 DFB-Pokal: 2017–18
Panathinaikos
Greek Cup: 2021–22
Serbia
 UEFA Under-19 Championship: 2013
 FIFA U-20 World Cup: 2015
Individual
 Serbian SuperLiga Team of the Season: 2013–14, 2014–15
Orders
 Medal of Merit (Republika Srpska)

Notes

References

External links

 
 
 

1995 births
Living people
Association football midfielders
Serbian footballers
Serbia youth international footballers
Serbia under-21 international footballers
Serbia international footballers
Bosnia and Herzegovina footballers
Bosnia and Herzegovina youth international footballers
Bundesliga players
Eintracht Frankfurt players
TSG 1899 Hoffenheim players 
FK Vojvodina players
Panathinaikos F.C. players
AEK Athens F.C. players
Serbian expatriate footballers
Expatriate footballers in Germany
Serbian expatriate sportspeople in Germany
Expatriate footballers in Greece
Serbian expatriate sportspeople in Greece
Serbian SuperLiga players
Serbs of Bosnia and Herzegovina
Footballers from Novi Sad
Super League Greece players
People from Trebinje